The Ministry of National Health Services, Regulation and Coordination (abbreviated as MoNHSRC) is a cabinet level ministry of the government of Pakistan with responsibility for national public health.

Organization
Healthcare was transferred to the provincial health departments after Eighteenth Amendment to the Constitution of Pakistan in June 2011. In May 2013 however the federal ministry was reinstated by Prime Minister Mir Hazar Khan Khoso, as the Ministry of National Health Services, Regulation and Coordination. The function of this new ministry was to provide provision of medical services, frame health policies and enforce the same at a national level. Dr. Allah Bakhsh Malik is Federal Secretary of the Ministry of National Health Services, Regulations and Coordination, Government of Pakistan. He served as Secretary to Government, Literacy and Basic Education Department with focus on Skill Development Programmes and Vocational Education. He also formulated Punjab Youth Policy 2012 as Secretary Youth Affairs, Sports, Tourism and Archaeology. He chaired the taskforce, for formulation of National TVET Policy 2015, dovetailing skills with employability. He worked at all levels in education sector for more than 25 years i.e. Primary, Elementary, Secondary, Higher, Technical and Vocational Education. He also served as Director General National Commission for Human Development NCHD  and Academy for Educational Planning and Management AEPAM. He served as Federal/ Additional Secretary, Ministry of Federal Education and Professional Training and currently leading the one of the largest education system in the world as Secretary Education Punjab. He also served as Direcctor General Quaid E Azam Academy for Educational Development QAED and Programme Deirecto Punjab Education Reforms Program PESRP. Dr Malik has several decades of experience in education, skill development, policy formulation, situational analysis and assessment, strategic planning, implementation, monitoring and evaluation. He has vast experience in implementing educational, social & development projects focussing human development.
In 2011 Dr. Malik was conferred UN - UNESCO Confucius Award and the title of Honourable Mention for his leadership role for promoting education and skill development for the disenfranchised and marginalized. He is Member of Board of Global Partnership of Education and Member of the Steering Committee on EFA by UNESCO. He holds MPhil degree in Development Economics - Cambridge University, PhD in Economics, Public Finance and Resource Mobilization - Punjab University and was visiting scholar at NCSPE Teachers College Columbia University, New York. He is Charles Wallace Trust fellow and visiting faculty to national and international institutions. His work has been extensively published.

The Central government rejected a proposed Rs 400 billion health insurance scheme in Punjab aimed at providing universal health coverage to the entire population, including the rich and the poor, due to concerns about untargeted subsidies and wasteful expenditures. The project was not approved by the Central Development Working Party after objections from the Planning Secretary and lack of resolution on previously established conditions for implementation. The project was sent back for review and decision by elected representatives.

Provincial departments
  Department of Health, Azad Jammu & Kashmir
  Department of Health, Balochistan
  Department of Health & Population Welfare, Gilgit-Baltistan

Autonomous Bodies

Drug Regulatory Authority of Pakistan
Drug Regulatory Authority of Pakistan was established under the Drug Regulatory Authority of Pakistan Act, 2012, is the main constitutional body to regulate therapeutic goods in the country. Therapeutic goods regulated by the DRAP include drugs, biological, medical devices, alternative medicines & health products. Previously, scope was limited to Drugs and Biologicals, however, it was extended to other categories after enactment of the Drugs Regulatory Authority of Pakistan Act, 2012.
Drug Regulatory Authority of Pakistan (DRAP) is mandated to provide for effective coordination and enforcement of The Drugs Act, 1976 (XXXI of 1976) and to bring harmony in inter-provincial trade and commerce of therapeutic goods. DRAP is responsible for ensuring that therapeutic goods approved and available in market meet prescribed standards of quality, safety and efficacy and are sold at reasonable prices. This includes registration and marketing authorization, vigilance, market surveillance and control, licensing establishments, regulatory inspection, laboratory testing, clinical trials oversight, pharmacovigilance and lot release of biologicals.
The Drug Regulatory Authority of Pakistan was established in 2012 and is the largest department in the Ministry of National Health Services, Regulation and Coordination, with its headquarters in Islamabad and regional offices in the provincial capitals of Karachi, Lahore, Peshawar and Quetta. DRAP has been established by the Federal Government, and its General direction, Administration and monitoring of the Authority vests with Policy Board of DRAP. The Authority comprises a Chief Executive Officer (CEO), appointed by the Federal Government and thirteen Directors, leading each Division of DRAP which perform various functions as mandated under the DRAP Act, 2012. These Divisions are majorly divided into two types, those performing regulatory activities, includes;- 
 Division of Pharmaceutical Evaluations & Registration
 Division of Drug Licensing
 Division of Health and OTC Products (non-drugs)
 Division of Medical Devices and Medicated Cosmetics
 Division of Pharmacy Services
 Division of Quality Assurance and Laboratory Testing
 Division of Biological Evaluation and Research
 Division of Controlled Drugs
 Division of Costing and Pricing
While supportive Divisions are;
 Division of Management Information Services
 Division of Budget and Accounts
 Division of Legal Affairs
 Division of Administration, HR and Logistics

Tobacco Control Cell
A separate cell was created in 2007. The rationale for the creation of the Cell stemmed from Pakistan’s international obligation. Pakistan is a signatory to WHO Framework Convention on Tobacco Control. The aim of Tobacco Control Cell is to enhance tobacco control efforts in Pakistan.

National Institute of Population Studies
National Institute of Population Studies (NIPS) is the  research organization established by the government since 1986. The NIPS has been mandated to act as a technical arm of the Government for undertaking high quality research and to produce evidence-based data, information for utilization by the Public sector and others agencies for policy formulation, strategic planning and making reference in the spheres of demography, population & development and health.

Directorate of Malaria Control
Directorate of Malaria Control is a separate cell in ministry to co-ordinate country-wide efforts for implementation of Roll Back Malaria initiative for 50% reduction in the malaria burden in Pakistan by the year 2010. By the year 2015 >70% of the high risk population of Pakistan having access and using effective malaria prevention and treatment.

Programs
The ministry directly runs several federal health programs nationwide:

National AIDS Control Program
National AIDS Control Program (NACP) was established in 1986-87. In its early stages, the program focused on laboratory diagnosis of suspected HIV cases.

National Tuberculosis Control Program
Having treated 700,000 tuberculosis patients so far, free diagnosis and treatment and public awareness regarding the disease are the main components of this program. It is currently headed by Lt. Aazam Parvez, Pakistan Army Medical Corps.

Devolved programs
The following programs were transferred to provincial health departments in 2011.

National Program for Family Planning & Primary Health Care (LHW) Program
LHW Program is the world's largest community based primary health care program delivering services through 96,000 LHWs in their own communities

 Expanded Program on Immunization (EPI)
EPI is aimed at immunizing children against Childhood Tuberculosis, Poliomyelitis, Diphtheria, Pertussis, Measles, Tetanus and also their mothers against Tetanus.

National Maternal, Neonatal & Child Health (MNCH) Program
The aim of the MNCH program is to improve accessibility and quality of health services and fill the resource gaps without duplicating inputs or activities.

 National Program for Prevention and Control of Hepatitis
More than 400,000 people have been vaccinated through this program, while 104 hospitals have been equipped to provide free treatment to patients.

See also 
 Health care in Pakistan

References

External links
 MNHSRC official website
 Drug Regulatory Authority of Pakistan
 Directorate of Malaria Control
 Tobacco Control Cell
 National AIDS Control Program
 National Institute of Population Studies
 National TB control program

Federal government ministries of Pakistan
Medical and health organisations based in Pakistan
Pakistan